François Bréda (20 February 1956 – 16 May 2018) was a Romanian essayist, poet, literary critic, literary historian, translator and theatrologist.

Biography 
On his mother's side he is grandson of writer, settlement historian, professor Lajos Lévai (1894, Kolozsvár – 1974) from Odorheiu Secuiesc. Her mother is educationalist Enikő Zsuzsanna Lévai. His father, reformed minister Ferenc Bréda (1924–2000) was dean of Hunedoara-Alba County between 19691988. He graduated elementary school in Odorheiu Secuiesc and Deva. The multicultural atmosphere of his native town follows him during his childhood and primary school years. His first writings appeared in Ifjúmunkás, a youth periodical published in Bucharest. He spent his military service in Northern Dobruja near the Black Sea (19741975). From 1975 he studied at the Hungarian-French faculty of the Cluj-Napoca University. He also attended Greek and Latin optional courses at the classical philology faculty in Cluj. He was one of the regular dwellers of the Library of Academy during his student years. It was this period he intensely studied the important authors of scholastic and medieval philosophy (Anselm of Canterbury, Saint Thomas Aquinas, Albertus Magnus, William of Ockham, Pierre Abelard, Duns Scotus). During summer holidays he worked as construction day-labourer, mason stringy at church reconstructions (Haró, Marosillye, Hunedoara County) and ringer. Between 19771979 he worked as editor of the Hungarian pages of Echinox cultural university periodical in Cluj, together with András Mihály Beke and Zoltán Bretter. He graduated at the philology faculty of Babeş-Bolyai University in Cluj, receiving qualification in Hungarian-French language and literature. Between 1979 and 1984 he worked as first editor of the Hungarian pages of Napoca Universitară cultural periodical. Between 1979 and 1984 he also worked as teacher of Hungarian literature and grammar at the Huedin Primary School. Between 19841991 he worked as professor of French language and literature in secondary schools, lyceums and high schools in France, first in Anjou and Vendée (Angers, Cholet), then in settlements near Paris (Faremoutiers, Saint-Maur-des-Fossés, Coulommiers, Pontault-Combault). In 1985 he received the degree of Magister at the Nantes University, in the field of French and comparative history of literature. Between 19851991 he was doctorandus of French history of literature at the Angers University, being disciple of literary historian George Cesbron. In the circle of Présence de Gabriel Marcel literary-philosophical fellowship he made acquaintance with Paul Ricœur, Cardinal Jean-Marie Lustiger, Archbishop of Paris, writer Claude Aveline, Georges Lubin, publisher of George Sand's correspondences, as well as philosopher André Comte-Sponville and other important personalities of French culture. He corresponded with sociologist Pierre Bourdieu and Samuel Beckett. Between 1984 and 1986 he lived in Angers and Cholet, then in Paris between 19861991. Between 19911992 he worked as editor at Jelenlét cultural periodical in Cluj. In 1991 he was founding member of György Bretter Literary Circle, a society with great literary traditions that had ceased to exist in 1983 and being revived after the 1989 revolution in Romania. Between 19921993 he worked as editor at the Cluj branch of Bucharest-based Kriterion Publishing House. From 1993 he is founding board member of György Bretter Literary Circle. Between 19911994 he taught French language and literature at Brassai Sámuel Lyceum in Cluj. In 1999 he received doctorate in theory of literature with his paper on the literary and drama critical work of French existentialist philosopher Gabriel Marcel, at the Philology Faculty of Babeş-Bolyai University in Cluj. From 1995 he works as assistant professor at the Theatre and Television Faculty of Babeş-Bolyai University, teaching universal theatre history of Antiquity, basic notions of dramaturgy, theatre aesthetics, Hungarian literature and rhetorics. He discovered the literary oeuvre of Alfréd Reinhold (Alfred Reynolds) (1907, Budapest – 1993, London). He translates from French and Romanian languages.

Works

Volumes in Hungarian 
 A létezéstől a lehetőségig (From Being to Possibility). Essays in comparative history of literature and philosophy, Kriterion Publishing House, Forrás-series, Bucharest, 1980.
 Tűzpróba (Ordeal by Fire). Poems. Kriterion Publishing House, Bucharest, 1984.
 Mentális Tárgyak Múzeuma (Museum of Mental Objects). Concrete poems. Matthias Studio Paper, Cluj-Napoca, 1999.
 Antracit (Anthracite). Ortho-existential essay. Előretolt Helyőrség Publishing House, Cluj-Napoca, 2002. 
 Golania Magna. A neo-goliárd költészet kritikai vetületei. (Golania Magna. Critical Aspects of Neo-Goliard Poetry). Critical works, Grinta Publishing House, Cluj-Napoca, 2005.
 Mysterium Mythologiae. Philosophical essay. Grinta Publishing House, Cluj-Napoca, 2005. 
 Nemo. Poems. AB-ART Publishing House, Bratislava, 2004. 
 Az elszállt szitakötő (Butterfly in Mid-Air). Novel. AB-ART Publishing House, Bratislava, 2005. 
 Diva Deva. Philosophical essay. Grinta Publishing House, Cluj-Napoca, 2006.  
 Golania Magna Secunda. Mitokritikák a neo-goliárd irodalomról (Golania Magna Secunda. Mytho-chritics on Neo-Goliard Literature). Critical writings, Irodalmi Jelen Books, Arad, 2007. 
 De amore. Philosophical essay. AB-ART Publishing House, Bratislava, 2008. 
 Boldogok és Bolondok (The Happy and the Insane). Philosophical essay. AB-ART Publishing House, Bratislava, 2008. 
 Lali lakomái (Lali's Feasts). Novel. AB-ART Publishing House, Bratislava, 2008. 
 Apolló apológiái. Aphorismes. AB-ART Publishing House, Bratislava, 2009. 
 Angyal a Monostoron. Novel. Erdélyi Híradó Kiadó, Előretolt Helyőrség Szépirodalmi Páholy, Előretolt Helyőrség Könyvek Publishing House. Kolozsvár, 2012. 
 De amore. Az emberi psziché Galaktikus Gáláiról, Sikamlós Skáláiról & Gáláns Galádságairól. Philosophical essay. A borító John Roddam Spencer Stanhope : Cupid and Psyche című képének felhasználásával készült. Illusztrációk : Zichy Mihály aktjai. Orpheusz Publishing House, Budapest, 2016. 
Levelek az Utókornak. Theatrvm Temporis. (Letters post Posterity. Theatrvm Temporis). Philosophical essay. Erdélyi Híradó Kiadó Publishing House, Kolozsvár, 2017. 
Bab és Babér. Theatrum epicum. (Bean and Laurel). Novel. Irodalmi Jelen Könyvek Publishing House, Arad, 2017.

Volumes in Romanian 
 Fiinţă şi teatru (Being and Theatre). Philosophical essay. Dacia Publishing House, Teatru series, Cluj-Napoca, 2003, 
 Scrisori despre comicul existenţial. Correspondenţă transtemporală (Letters on Existential Humour. Trans-temporal Correspondence). Philosophical essay. Grinta Publishing House, Cluj-Napoca, 2006. 
 Oglinda Ochiului. Speculum spectationis (The Mirror of the Eye). Philosophical essay. Eikon Publishing House – Editura Remus, Cluj-Napoca, 2010.  
Cercetare în Cer. Philosophical essay. Editura Școala Ardeleană Publishing House, Cluj-Napoca, 2017.

Volumes in French 
 La critique littéraire et dramatique de Gabriel Marcel (Literary and Drama Critical Work of Gabriel Marcel). Essay, Grinta Publishing House, Cluj-Napoca, 2004. 
 Déclin et Déclic. Philosophical essay. Remus Publishing House, Cluj-Napoca, 2004. 
Genivs loci. Philosophical essay. Editura Școala Ardeleană Publishin House, Cluj-Napoca, 2017.

Essays in Literary Critic and History of Ideas 
 Ave Csehy ! In : Helikon, 28 (25 June 2007). See Zoltán Csehy 
 Vanda ... Van ! Az Örök Őrök (Vanda... Exists! The Guards of Eternity). In: Korunk, August 2006. 
 Esti mese (Bedtime Story). György Méhes. In : Helikon, 2002/ 7, 2–3. 
 Egy világrendszer keletkezéséről. Adalékok Galilei Dialogójához. (On the Becoming of a World System. To Galilei's Dialogo). In: Galilei, Dialogue Concerning the Two Chief World Systems, the Ptolemaic and a Copernican. Preface written and notes compiled by Ferenc Bréda. Kriterion, Téka-series, Bucharest, 1983. 
 Az öntudat alkonya. (Dawn of Consciousness) In : A létezéstől a lehetőségig (From Being to Possibility). Kriterion, Bucharest, 1980. 
 Gabriel Marcel et ses contemporains. François Mauriac et Gabriel Marcel. In : Confluențe și particularități europene. Coordonator : Valentin Trifescu. Editura Eikon, Cluj, 2010, pp. 183–209.  
 Cercetare în Cer. Concepția muzicală a Cerului creștin în gândirea Sfântului Ioan Gură de Aur. In : Austrian Influences and Regional Identities in Transilvania, AB-ART, Bratislava ; Grenzenlose Literatur, Frauenkirchen, 2012, pp. 248–254.   
 De Cluj jusqu'au Caire. Un créateur multiculturel : le poète, l'écrivain et le metteur en scène Shawkat Seif Eddine bey. In : Romanian – Moroccan Forms of Manifestation in the European Space. Editura Institutului de Științe Politice și Relații Internaționale, Academia Română, București, 2014, pp. 94–108. 
 Genius Loci. In : Geografii identitare – Identități culturale. Coordinatori Pavel Pușcaș, Valentin Trifescu, Simion Molnar, Vali Ilyes. Volumul 1. Simpozionul multicultural Diva Deva. Presa Universitară Clujeană, Cluj-Napoca, 2014, pp. 31–33.   
 Cerul creștin : patrimoniu etern al multiversului identității locale transcosmice. Geografia teo-teatrologică a Cerului în gândirea Sfântului Ioan Gură de Aur. In : Patrimoniu și identitate locală. Actele conferinței Patrimoniu și identitate locală, Valea Verde, 5–7 septembrie 2014. Coordinatori : Valentin Trifescu, Vali Ilyes, François Bréda. Editura Universității Alexandru Ioan Cuză, Iași, 2015. pp. 163–176.    
 A létezés mint közönség. Theatrum et theos (teo-teatrológiai napló). In : Előretolt Helyőrség. Ezredévkönyv. Erdélyi Híradó kiadó, Kolozsvár, 2015, pp. 40–42.  
 Le temple des temps dans le théâtre de Protée. In : Patrimoniu și identitate locală. Actele conferinței Patrimoniu și identitate locală, Valea Verde, 5–7 septembrie 2014. Coordinatori : Valentin Trifescu, Vali Ilyes, François Bréda. Editura Universității Alexandru Ioan Cuză, Iași, 2015. pp. 13–16.

Translations[modifier | modifier le code] 

 Gabriel Marcel, Omul problematic, L’homme problématique (The problematic man). Text translated into Romanian and annotated by François Bréda and Ștefan Melancu. Les Éditions Apostrof, coll. Filosofie contemporană, Cluj-Napoca, 1998.
 Jehan Calvus (Chelu Ivan Péter), Bumgártész. Text translated from Romanian into Hungarian by François Bréda. Kalligram Publishing, Bratislava, 2004.
 Gabriel Marcel, Semnul Crucii , Le Signe de la Croix. (The Sign of the Cross). Text translated into Romanian and annotated by François Bréda and Radu Teampău. Târgu Jiu, 1999. Show performed at the Elvira Godeanu Theater in Târgu Jiu in 1999.
 Jean Cocteau, Emberi hang, La Voix Humaine. (The Human Voice). Text translated into Hungarian by François Bréda. In: Napoca Universitară, 1-3 / 1981.
 Christian Palustran, Hăul ,Abîmes. . (Abyss). Text translated into Romanian by François Bréda and Radu Teampău. Show performed at the Turda State Theater, 1998.
 Gabriel Chifu, Száz költemény O sută de poeme, Cent poèmes. (One hundred poems). Text translated from Romanian into Hungarian by François Bréda, 2008.

Prize 
 Méhes György-Grand Prizes, 2005.
 Bretter György-Prizes, 2010.

Distinction 
The Knight Cross of Order of Merit of Hungary, 2017.

Memberships 
He is member of Hungarian Writers' Ligue in Transylvania, Romanian Writers' Union, Présence de Gabriel Marcel Association and the Public Body of the Hungarian Academy of Sciences.

Further reading 
 Szőcs Géza, Ki vagy, Bréda ? In : Igazság, Fellegvár, Cluj, 1977. 
 Molnár Gusztáv: Levél Bréda Ferenchez. Echinox, Cluj, 1979/1-2. 
 Vekerdi László, Bréda Ferenc, A létezéstől a lehetőségig. In : Valóság, Budapest, 1981/ 1. 
 Szőcs István, Transz-ok, avagy erdélyi Grál. [Bréda Ferenc, Antracit]. In : Helikon, Kolozsvár, 2002/ 14, 2–3. 
 Szőcs István, Grál-visszfények ? In : Helikon, Kolozsvár, 2002/ 15, 2–3. 
 Szőcs István, Merengő – Mágus Déva vára. In : Helikon, XVIII. évf., 2007., 7. (477.). 
 Szőcs István, Bréda Capytulációja avagy Szóból ért az ember ! In : Helikon, 2006., 18. (464.)
 Szőcs István, Jegyzet – A hmhmhm... A szerelem ... In : Helikon, Kolozsvár, 2008/ 12. 
 Ovidiu Pecican, Fiinţã şi Teatru. Teatrul de umbre al luminii. In : Tribuna, nr. 69., 2005. p. 7. 
 Laura Pavel, Teatru – farsă şi adevăr ? In : Contemporanul-Ideea europeană, XV., nr. 8, 2004. 
 Mircea Arman, Scrisori despre comicul existenţial. In : Jurnalul Literar, Bucharest, 2007, p. 23. 
 Graţian Cormoş, Trãind în post-istorie, fãrã iluzii. In : Tribuna, Cluj, nr. 96, 2006. 
 Mihai Borşoş, Democraţia şi omenescul. In : Tribuna, 2008/ 149, p. 6. 
 Ștefan Manasia, Învățăturile magistrului François. În : Tribuna, nr. 207, 16–30 aprilie 2011, p. 5.  
 Karácsonyi Zsolt, Nemo és a kutyák. In : A Nagy kilometrik, Helikon, 34/ 2007. 
 Karácsonyi Zsolt, A margótól az argóig. In : Krónika, 2004. 5–7 Nov 
 Székely Csaba, A Brettenthetetlenek. In : A Hét, 2004/ 38, 11. 
 Orbán János Dénes, Merlin Claudiopolisban. In : Bréda, Antracit, Erdélyi Híradó / Előretolt Helyőrség, Kolozsvár, 2002, pp. 5–10.
 Farkas Wellmann Endre, Bolondokról, a bolondok nyelvén. In : Krónika, 2008. 21–23 November., p. 6. 
 Király Farkas, A könyv címe : Nemo. In : Helikon, 2005/ 23. 
 Király Farkas, A mito-kán most rábeszél . In : Helikon, 2005. július 10. 
 Martos Gábor, Marsallbot a hátizsákban. A Forrás harmadik nemzedéke. Kolozsvár, 1994.
 Szántai János, Jelenés Dívával, Dévával. In : Székelyföld, 2008/ 5. 
 Szántai János, A klozettolvasó naplójából, 9. (François Bréda, Boldogok és Bolondok, AB-ART, Pozsony, 2008.) In : Helikon, Kolozsvár, 2009/ 1, p. 14. 
 Martos Gábor, Éjegyenlőség. Írások az erdélyi magyar irodalomról. Erdélyi Híradó Könyv- és Lapkiadó, Kolozsvár, 2000. 
 Martos Gábor,Volt egyszer egy Fellegvár. Erdélyi Híradó Könyv- és Lapkiadó, Kolozsvár, 1994. 
 Martos Gábor, Az út vége (?). In : Kép(es) költészet, Patriot kiadó, Sopron, 1995, pp. 76–80. 
 Szalai Zsolt, Bréda, Antracit. In : www. szepirodalmifigyelo.hu 
 Pál Edit Éva, Tudatskalpok és az irodalom. In : www. transindex.ro 
 Vári Csaba és Sipos Zoltán, Bréda Ferenc, aki Mumu forever. In : www. transindex.ro 
 Miklós Ágnes Kata, A szóértés feltételei. Nemzedékváltási problémák a hetvenes évek romániai magyar irodalmában. Komp-Press Kiadó, Kolozsvár, pp. 211–214., 2010.  
 Ștefan Manasia, Învățăturile magistrului François. Oglinda Ochiului, Speculum Spectationis, Cluj, Editura Eikon, 2010. In : Tribuna, nr. 207, 16–30 aprilie 2011, p. 5. 
 Ani Bradea, Cluj-Huedin sau Paris-Coulommiers e exact același lucru pe la șase dimineața. De vorbă cu François Bréda. In : Tribuna, nr. 279, 16–30 aprilie 2014, p. 12-13.  
 Egyed Péter, Irodalmi rosta. Kritikák, esszék, tanulmányok (1976–2014). Polis Könyvkiadó, Kolozsvár, 2014, pp. 129, 220, 233, 599, 647.  
 Vasile Muscă, 
 Ștefan Manasia, 19 ianuarie 2016 : O zi pe gustul lui François. In : Tribuna, nr. 325, 16–30 aprilie 2016, p. 19. 
 Valentin Trifescu, Metode de supraviețuire în filosofia lui François Bréda. In : Tribuna, nr. 346, 1–15 februarie 2017, p. 8-9. 
 Karácsonyi Zsolt, A szerző mint mű és közöttiség. Egy lehetséges létmód alapvonalai. In : Karácsonyi Zsolt, A gép, ha visszanéz. Mítosz – Média – Színház. Kritikák, tanulmányok. Orpheusz kiadó, Budapest, 2017, pp. 82–92.  
 Metamorfoze ale identităţii de margine. Volum dedicat lui François Bréda. Coordonatori : Valentin Trifescu, Lóránd Boros, Vali Ilyes, Anca Elisabeta Tatay, Ana-Magdalena Petraru, Georgiana Medrea Estienne. Presa Universitară Clujeană Publishing House, Cluj-Napoca, 2016.

References

External links 
  Site officiel de l'Association Présence de Gabriel Marcel
  Homepage of Romanian Writer's Union, Cluj-Napoca
  Homepage of Hungarian Scientific Academy

1956 births
2018 deaths
20th-century Romanian poets
21st-century Romanian poets
Romanian essayists
Hungarian essayists
Male essayists
Hungarian male poets
Romanian writers in French
Hungarian-language writers
Romanian schoolteachers
Aphorists
Romanian literary historians
Hungarian literary historians
Romanian people of Hungarian descent
People from Deva, Romania
20th-century essayists
21st-century essayists
20th-century Romanian male writers
21st-century Romanian male writers
Romanian male poets
20th-century Hungarian male writers
21st-century Hungarian male writers